Starksia hoesei, the hose blenny, is a species of labrisomid blenny native to the eastern Pacific Ocean and the Gulf of California where it is known to occur at depths of from . The specific name honours the ichthyologist Douglass F. Hoese of the Australian Museum in Sydney.

References

hoesei
Fish described in 1971
Taxa named by Richard Heinrich Rosenblatt